Koryn Mattanah Hawthorne (born December 26, 1997) is an American contemporary Christian music and gospel singer. Hawthorne was a finalist in season 8 of NBC's singing competition The Voice, at the age of 17, as a member on Pharrell Williams's team. After placing fourth on the show, Hawthorne got signed to RCA Inspiration, a division of Sony Music dedicated to gospel music recordings. Her debut studio album, Unstoppable, was released on July 13, 2018, and earned her multiple awards nominations, including two Grammy nominations.

Career

2015: The Voice
Koryn Hawthorne auditioned for the eighth season of The Voice singing Emeli Sandé's "My Kind of Love". Both Christina Aguilera and Williams turned around. Hawthorne chose Aguilera as her coach. In the Battle rounds, Hawthorne faced Vance Smith, where they sang "Love Me Harder", a duet by Ariana Grande and The Weeknd. Hawthorne was chosen over Smith. During the Knockout rounds, she covered "Try" but lost to her opponent Kimberly Nichole. She was then stolen by Williams.

During the Playoffs she sang How Great Thou Art but was not chosen by the public, who could only save two artists from Williams' team. Williams, who could save one of his three remaining artists, chose her. The following week, she sang Kelly Clarkson's "Stronger (What Doesn't Kill You)" and was saved by public voting. In the Top 10 she performed "Make It Rain" by Foy Vance, reaching the third position on iTunes and debuting at the 84th position on Hot 100. The following week, she covered "Girl on Fire" by Alicia Keys and was saved by the public.

In the Top 6, Hawthorne showed her rock side covering R.E.M's "Everybody Hurts" and Aerosmith's "Dream On". In the Top 5, after singing U2's "One" and the traditional song, "Oh Mary Don't You Weep", she was, alongside India Carney, in the bottom two. She sang Beyoncé's "If I Were a Boy" for her last chance performance, being instantly saved over Carney. In the finale, Hawthorne performed "It's a Man's Man's Man's World" by James Brown, The Beatles' "We Can Work It Out" with coach Williams and also her original song "Bright Fire", written by Williams. She finished in 4th place.

Throughout the competition, Hawthorne's evolution as a singer caught the attention of the coaches. Adam Levine pointed out that never before in the history of The Voice had he seen "such a drastic, incredible, unbelievable journey". Williams compared her drive to succeed to that of Beyoncé. Abbeville Mayor Mark Piazza declared May 6, 2015 "Koryn Hawthorne Day" and presented her with the key to the city.

 – Studio version of performance reached the top 10 on iTunes

2016–2017: Record deal and EP release
After finishing in fourth place on The Voice, Hawthorne got signed to RCA Inspiration, a division of Sony Music dedicated to gospel music recordings, and started working on her debut material. In February 2016, she announced via Twitter she would be guest-starring on the fifth season of Mary Mary, that first aired on March 3. On the reality TV show, Hawthorne got to know producer Warryn Campbell, who would later help to produce her original material. On March 6, 2016, the TV show Saints & Sinners, in which Hawthorne recorded the song Saints & Sinners for the original soundtrack, was premiered on Bounce TV. In 2017, Hawthorne collaborated with Christian recording artist Branan Murphy on the single "All the Wrong Things". Following the appearance on Mary Mary, Hawthorne made a guest appearance on OWN's TV show Greenleaf, debuting "Won't He Do It", the lead single from her debut material.

Koryn Hawthorne – EP, a four-track EP, was released on August 11, 2017. Hawthorne's vocals and delivery attracted Grammy Award-winning producers and songwriters Warryn Campbell, Makeba Riddick, Bernie Herms and Joaquin "The Bear" Bynum, who produced and penned her debut material. The EP earned Hawthorne two Stellar Gospel Music Awards nominations for New Artist of the Year and Contemporary Female Vocalist of the Year.

2018–2019: Debut album release and Grammy Awards nomination
Koryn's full-length debut, Unstoppable, was released on July 13, 2018, and reached number 1 on the Top Gospel Albums, while the album's lead single, "Won't He Do It", reached number 1 on Billboard's three main gospel charts. Hawthorne is the first woman to top four gospel charts simultaneously in five years as well as the longest number 1 female artist holder on Billboard's Hot Gospel Songs Chart.

Alongside Jeremy Camp, Matthew West and Rend Collective, she was one of the attractions of the Christian music's summer concert event Summer Lights Tour, which started on July 12, 2018, in Detroit and ended on July 22, 2018, in Corbin.

On July 26, 2018, Aaron Cole's new single, "Down Like That", in which Koryn is featured, was released.

Later this year, Hawthorne was nominated for the 49th Annual GMA Dove Awards in two categories: New Artist of the Year and Contemporary Gospel/Urban Recorded Song of the Year for her debut single "Won't He Do It", and won the latter.

In November 2018, Hawthorne took the stage on Soul Train Awards, performing her hit single "Won't He Do It".

In February 2019, the music video for "Unstoppable" was released, featuring Lecrae.

Koryn Hawthorne received a nomination for Best Gospel Performance/Song ("Won't He Do It") on the 61st Grammy Award. She also received seven Stellar Awards nominations and two NAACP Image Awards nominations, having won one from each award. Later this year, she was nominated for the Billboard Music Awards 2019, in three categories.

In August 2019, Koryn contributed to Overcomer soundtrack with the single "Enough".

Hawthorne was nominated for Best Gospel Performance/Song ("Speak the Name") on the 62nd Grammy Awards, making it her second Grammy nomination.

In December 2019, Koryn's debut single "Won't He Do It" was officially certified Gold.

2020–present: ‘’I AM’’

On July 24, 2020, Koryn released "Pray", the lead single from her second album, which reached number 1 on Billboard's Gospel Digital Song Sales chart. On August 7, the album's second single, "Speak to Me", was released. Hawthorne's album, ‘’I AM’’, was released on September 18, 2020.

For the second year in a row, Koryn Hawthorne was nominated for Billboard Top Gospel Artist category alongside Kirk Franklin, Tasha Cobbs Leonard, Sunday Service Choir and Kanye West.

Koryn was nominated for the Best Gospel/Inspirational Award on BET’s annual Soul Train Awards 2020, competing against long-time artists Bebe Winans, Kirk Franklin, Marvin Sapp, PJ Morton and The Clark Sisters.

On February 2021, Hawthorne was nominated for the Best Gospel/Christian Album on NAACP Image Award. Koryn was also nominated for the third year in a row for the Billboard Music Awards 2021, in three categories. Her single "Speak to Me" was nominated for two categories on the 52nd GMA Dove Awards: Song of the Year and Contemporary Gospel Recorded Song of the Year.

Influences
Hawthorne cites a variety of artists as her main influences and inspirations, including Jt, Etta James, Mary J. Blige, Tina Turner, Michael Jackson, Lauryn Hill, Fred Hammond, Mary Mary, Kirk Franklin, among others.

Discography

Studio albums

EPs

Singles

As lead artist

Other charted songs

Promotional singles

As featured artist

Releases from The Voice 
Albums

Competition singles

Awards and nominations

American Music Awards

|-
|2021
| Koryn Hawthorne
| Favorite Gospel Artist
| 
|}

Billboard Music Awards

|-
|rowspan="3" | 2019
| Koryn Hawthorne
|
| 
|-
| Unstoppable
| Top Gospel Album
| 
|-
| "Won't He Do It"
| Top Gospel Song
| 
|-
| 2020
| Koryn Hawthorne
| Top Gospel Artist
| 
|-
|rowspan="3" | 2021
| Koryn Hawthorne
| Top Gospel Artist
| 
|-
| I AM
| Top Gospel Album
| 
|-
| "Speak to Me"
| Top Gospel Song
| 
|}

GMA Dove Awards

|-
|rowspan="2" | 2018
| Koryn Hawthorne
| New Artist of the 
| 
|-
| "Won't He Do It"
| Contemporary Gospel/Urban Recorded Song of the Year
| 
|-
|rowspan="4" | 2019
| Koryn Hawthorne
| Gospel Artist of the Year
| 
|-
| "Won't He Do It"
| Song of the Year
| 
|-
| "Unstoppable"
| Contemporary Gospel Recorded Song of the Year
| 
|-
| Unstoppable
| Contemporary Gospel Album of the Year
| 
|-
| 2020
| Koryn Hawthorne
| Best Gospel/Inspirational Award
| 
|-
| rowspan="2" | 2021
| "Speak to Me" || Song of the Year || 
|-
| I Am || Contemporary Gospel Album of the Year || 
|}

Grammy Award

|-
| 2019 || "Won't He Do It" || Best Gospel Performance/Song || 
|-
| 2020 || "Speak the Name" || Best Gospel Performance/Song || 
|}

NAACP Image Awards

|-
|rowspan="2" | 2019
| Koryn Hawthorne
| Outstanding New Artist
| 
|-
| Unstoppable
| Outstanding Gospel Album (Traditional or Contemporary)
| 
|-
| 2021
| I AM
| Outstanding Gospel/Christian Album
| 
|}

Stellar Gospel Music Awards

|-
| rowspan="2" | 2018 || rowspan="6" | Koryn Hawthorne || New Artist of the Year || 
|-
| Contemporary Female Vocalist of the Year || 
|-
| rowspan="7" | 2019 || Artist of the Year || 
|- 
| Albertina Walker Female Vocalist of the Year || 
|-
| Producer of the Year || 
|-
| Contemporary Female Vocalist of the Year || 
|-
| rowspan="2" | "Won't He Do It" || Song of the Year || 
|-
| Music Video of the Year || 
|-
| Unstoppable || Contemporary CD of the Year || 
|-
|}

Soul Train Awards

|-
|2020
| Koryn Hawthorne
| Best Gospel/Inspirational Award
| 
|}

References

1997 births
Living people
21st-century African-American women singers
Singers from Louisiana
American contemporary R&B singers
American soul singers
American gospel singers
The Voice (franchise) contestants
21st-century American singers
Participants in American reality television series
21st-century American women singers